Heflin is an unincorporated community in Stafford County, in the U.S. state of Virginia.

References

Unincorporated communities in Virginia
Unincorporated communities in Stafford County, Virginia